Dr Boondigga and the Big BW is the second studio album by the New Zealand group Fat Freddy's Drop, released on 2 June 2009 on The Drop. The album became a number-one album in New Zealand in its first week of release and was certified Platinum in four days. It has since been certified 2× Platinum.

The record was the highest-selling album in New Zealand for that year, selling over 30,000 copies.

Track listing
All songs written and performed by Fat Freddy's Drop.
"Big BW" – 6:15
"Shiverman" – 10:36
"Boondigga" – 6:00
"The Raft" – 7:13
"Pull the Catch" – 5:18
"The Camel" featuring Alice Russell – 9:38
"The Nod" – 8:41
"Wild Wind" – 6:58
"Breakthrough" – 8:50

Charts

References

2009 albums
Fat Freddy's Drop albums